Jerkins-Duffy House, also known as the Clarence B. Beasley House, is a historic home located at New Bern, Craven County, North Carolina.  It was built about 1833, and is a -story, three bay, side-hall plan, transitional Federal / Greek Revival style frame dwelling. It has an engaged, full-width two-story rear gallery and one-story wings.  It sits on a high brick foundation.

It was listed on the National Register of Historic Places in 1988.

References

Houses on the National Register of Historic Places in North Carolina
Federal architecture in North Carolina
Greek Revival houses in North Carolina
Houses completed in 1833
Houses in New Bern, North Carolina
National Register of Historic Places in Craven County, North Carolina